This is a list of state leaders in the 19th century from the Holy Roman Empire up to the time of German mediatisation (1801–1806) AD.

Main

Holy Roman Empire, Kingdom of Germany (complete list, complete list) –
Francis II, Emperor Elect, King (1792–1806)

Austria

Archduchy/ Austrian Empire (complete list) –
Archduke/Emperors (complete list) –
Francis II, Archduke (1792–1804), Emperor (1804–1835)

Kingdom of Hungary (complete list) –
Francis II, King (1792–1835)

Principality of Auersperg (complete list) –
Wilhelm I, Prince (1800–1806)

Prince-Bishopric of Brixen (complete list) –
Karl Franz Lodron, Prince-bishop (1791–1803)

Prince-Bishopric of Chur (complete list) –
Karl Rudolf Graf von Buol-Schauenstein, Prince-bishop (1794–1803)

Fürstenberg-Fürstenberg (complete list) –
Charles Joachim, Prince (1796–1804)

Principality of Heitersheim (complete list) –
Ignaz Balthasar Rinck von Baldenstein, Prince-prior (1796–1806)

Liechtenstein (complete list) –
Aloys I, Prince (1781–1805)
Johann I Josef, Prince (1805–1836)

Duchy of Teschen (Cieszyn) (complete list) –
Albert Casimir, Duke (1766–1822)

Prince-Bishopric of Trent (complete list) –
Emmanuel Maria Graf von Thun und Hohenstein, Prince-bishop (1800–1802), Prince (1802–1803)

Bavarian

Electorate/ Kingdom of Bavaria (complete list) –
Maximillian IV, Elector (1799–1805), King (1805–1825)

Berchtesgaden Prince-Provostry (complete list) –
Joseph Konrad von Schroffenberg-Mös, Prince-provost (1780–1803)

Saint Emmeram's Abbey (complete list) –
Coelestin II Steiglehner, Prince-Abbot (1791–1803)

Prince-Bishopric of Freising (complete list) –
Joseph Conrad Freiherr, Prince-bishop (1790–1802)

Prince-Abbey of Niedermünster (complete list) –
Maria Violanta von Lerchenfeld-Premberg, Abbess (1793–1801)
Maria Helena von Freien-Seiboltsdorf, Abbess (1801–1803)

Prince-Abbey of Obermünster (complete list) –
Maria Josepha von Neuenstein-Hubacker, Abbess (1775–1803)

Imperial County of Ortenburg (complete list) –
Joseph Charles Leopold, Count (1787–1805)

Pappenheim (complete list) –
Charles Theodore Frederick Eugene Francis, Count (1792–1806)

Prince-Bishopric of Passau (complete list) –
Leopold Leonard, Prince-Bishop (1796–1803)

Prince-Bishopric of Regensburg (complete list) –
Joseph Konrad von Schroffenberg, Prince-bishop (1790–1803)

Prince-Archbishopric of Salzburg (complete list) –
Hieronymus von Colloredo, Prince-archbishop (1772–1803)

Bohemian

Kingdom of Bohemia (complete list) –
Francis II, King (1792–1835)

Franconian

Prince-Bishopric of Bamberg (complete list) –
Christoph Franz von Buseck, Prince-bishop (1795–1802)

Prince-Bishopric of Eichstätt (complete list, de) –
, Prince-bishop (1790–1802)

Hohenlohe-Bartenstein (complete list) –
Louis Aloysius, Prince (1799–1806)
Karl August, Prince (1806)

Hohenlohe-Ingelfingen (complete list) –
Frederick Louis, Prince (1796–1806)
August, Prince (1806)

Hohenlohe-Jagstberg (complete list) –
, Prince (1798–1806)

Hohenlohe-Kirchberg (complete list) –
, Prince (1767–1806)

Hohenlohe-Langenburg (complete list) –
Karl Ludwig, Prince (1789–1806)

Hohenlohe-Oehringen –
, Prince (1765–1805)
inherited by Frederick Louis of Hohenlohe-Ingelfingen

Hohenlohe-Waldenburg-Schillingsfürst (complete list) –
Charles Albert III, Prince (1796–1806)

Schönborn-Heusenstamm (complete list) –
Anselm Posthumous, Count (1726–1801)

Schönborn-Wiesentheid (complete list) –
Damian Hugo Erwin, Count (1772–1806)

Prince-Bishopric of Würzburg (complete list) –
Georg Karl Ignaz von Fechenbach zu Laudenbach, Prince-bishop (1795–1803)

Electoral Rhenish

Arenberg (complete list) –
Louis Engelbert, Duke (1778–1803)
Prosper Louis, Duke (1803–1810)

Elector-Archbishopric of Cologne (complete list) –
Maximilian Franz of Austria, Archbishop-elector (1784–1801)
Anton Viktor of Austria, Archbishop-elector (1801–1803)

Elector-Bishopric of Mainz (complete list) –
Friedrich Karl Joseph von Erthal, Archbishop-elector (1774–1802)
Karl Theodor Anton Maria von Dalberg, Archbishop-elector (1802–1803)

Electoral Palatinate (complete list) –
Maximilian I Joseph, Count Palatine of Zweibrücken (1795–1799), Elector of Palatinate and of Bavaria (1799–1803)

Thurn und Taxis (complete list) –
Karl Anselm, Prince (1773–1805)
Karl Alexander, Prince (1805–1806)

Elector-Bishopric of Trier (complete list) –
Clemens Wenzel of Saxony, Archbishop-elector (1768–1801)

Lower Rhenish–Westphalian

Bentheim-Bentheim (complete list) –
Frederick Charles, Count (1731–1803)
Louis of Bentheim-Steinfurt, Count (1803–1806)

Bentheim-Steinfurt (complete list) –
Louis, Count (1780–1803)

Bentheim-Tecklenburg-Rheda (complete list) –
Moritz Kasimir II, Count (1768–1805)
Emil Friedrich I, Count (1805–1808)

Princely Abbey of Corvey (de:complete list) –
, Prince-bishop (1794–1802)

Essen Abbey (complete list) –
Maria Kunigunde of Saxony, Princess-Abbess (1776–1802)

Herford Abbey (complete list) –
Frederica Charlotte, Abbess (1764–1802)

Limburg-Styrum-Borkelö (complete list) –
Otto Ernest Gelder, Count (1776–1806)

Limburg-Styrum-Bronchhorst (complete list) –
Frederick Theodore Ernest, Count (1766–1806)

Limburg-Styrum-Styrum (complete list) –
, Countess (1794–1806)

Principality of Lippe (complete list) –
Leopold I, Count (1782–1789), Prince (1789–1802)
Leopold II, Prince (1802–1851)

Lippe-Biesterfeld (complete list) –
Karl, Count (1781–1810)

Prince-Bishopric of Münster (complete list) –
Maximilian Franz, Prince-bishop (1784–1801)
Anton Victor, Prince-bishop (1801–1802)

Principality of Orange-Nassau –
William V (1751–1806)
William I (1806, 1813–1815)

Principality of Nassau-Orange-Fulda –
William I, Prince (1803–1806)

Duchy of Oldenburg (complete list) –
Wilhelm I, Duke (1785–1810), Grand Duke (1815–1823)

Principality of Orange-Nassau (complete list) –
William V, Prince (1751–1806)
William VI, Prince (1806)

Prince-Bishopric of Osnabrück (complete list) –
Frederick of York and Albany, Prince-bishop (1764–1802)

Prince-Bishopric of Paderborn (complete list) –
Franz Egon von Fürstenberg, Prince-bishop (1789–1825)

Wied-Neuwied (complete list) –
Frederick Charles, Prince (1791–1802)
John Augustus, Prince (1802–1806)

Wied-Runkel (complete list) –
Karl Ludwig Friedrich Alexander, Prince (1791–1806)

Upper Rhenish

Prince-Bishopric of Basel (complete list) –
Franz Xaver von Neveu, Prince-bishop (1794–1803)

Free City of Frankfurt (de:complete list) –
Senior Mayors (de:complete list) –
, Senior Mayor (1800–1801)
Adolph Carl von Humbracht, Senior Mayor (1801–1802)
Johann Nicolaus Olenschlager von Olenstein, Senior Mayor (1802–1803)
Johann Friedrich von Riese, Senior Mayor (1803–1804)
Johann Nicolaus Olenschlager von Olenstein, Senior Mayor (1804–1805)
Friedrich August von Wiesenhütten, Senior Mayor (1805–1806)
Anton Ulrich Carl von Holzhausen, Senior Mayor (1806)
Stadtschultheißens (de:complete list) –
Johann Friedrich Maximilian von Stalburg, Stadtschultheißen (1788–1802)
Wilhelm Carl Ludwig Moors, Stadtschultheißen (1788–1806)
Friedrich Carl Schweitzer, Stadtschultheißen (1806)

Princely Abbey of Fulda (complete list) –
, Prince-bishop (1789–1802)

Hesse-Darmstadt (complete list) –
Louis X, Landgrave of Hesse-Darmstadt (1790–1806), Grand Duke of Hesse (1806–1830)

Grand Duchy of Hesse and by Rhine (complete list) –
Louis I, Landgrave of Hesse-Darmstadt (1790–1806), Grand Duke of Hesse (1806–1830)

Hesse-Homburg (complete list) –
Frederick V, Landgrave (1751–1820)

Hesse-Kassel (complete list) –
William XIII, Landgrave of Hesse-Kassel (1785–1803), Elector of Hesse (1803–1807, 1813–1821)

Electorate of Hesse (complete list) –
William I, Landgrave of Hesse-Kassel (1785–1803), Elector of Hesse (1803–1807, 1813–1821)

Hesse-Philippsthal (complete list) –
William, Landgrave (1770–1806)

Hesse-Philippsthal-Barchfeld (complete list) –
Adolph, Landgrave (1777–1803)
Charles, Landgrave (1803–1854)

Hesse-Rotenburg (complete list) –
Charles Emmanuel, Landgrave (1778–1812)

Isenburg-Birstein (complete list) –
Wolfgang Ernest II, Prince (1754–1803)
Charles of Isenburg, Prince of Isenburg (1803–1806)

Isenburg-Büdingen (complete list) –
Ernst Casimir II. von Isenburg und Büdingen, Count (1775–1801)
, Count (1801–1840), Prince (1840–1848)

Isenburg-Büdingen-Birstein (complete list) –
Wolfgang Ernest II, Prince (1754–1803)
Karl, Prince (1803–1820)

Isenburg-Meerholz (complete list) –
John Frederick William, Count (1774–1802)
Charles Louis William, Count (1802–1806)

Isenburg-Philippseich (complete list) –
Henry Ferdinand, Count (1779–1806)

Isenburg-Wächtersbach –
Louis Maximilian I, Count (1798–1805)
Louis Maximilian II, Count (1805–1806)

Principality of Isenburg (complete list) –
Charles of Isenburg, Prince of Isenburg (1803–1806)

Leiningen-Dagsburg-Falkenburg – 
Maria Louise Albertine, Countess (1766–c.1803)

Leiningen-Westerburg-Altleiningen (de:complete list) –
Christian Karl, Count (1770–1806)

Leiningen-Westerburg-Neuleiningen (de:complete list) –
Ferdinand Karl III, Count (1798–1806)

Principality of Leiningen (de:complete list) –
Carl Friedrich Wilhelm, Count (1756–1779), Prince (1779–1807)

Nassau-Usingen (complete list) –:*Charles William, Prince (1775–1803)
Frederick Augustus, Prince of Nassau-Usingen (1803–1806), Duke of Nassau (1806–1816)

Nassau-Weilburg (complete list) –
Frederick William, Princely count (1788–1806), Prince (1806–1816)

Salm-Horstmar (complete list) –
Frederick Charles Augustus, Count (1803–1813)

Salm-Kyrburg (complete list) –
Frederick IV, Prince (1794–1813)

Salm-Reifferscheid-Bedburg (complete list) –	
Francis William, Altgrave (1798–1804), Prince (1804–1806)

Salm-Reifferscheid-Dyck (complete list) –
Francis William, Count (1798–1804), Prince (1804–1806)

Salm-Reifferscheid-Hainsbach (complete list) –
Francis Wenceslaus, Altgrave (1769–1811)

Salm-Reifferscheid-Krautheim (complete list) –
Francis William, Altgrave (1798–1804), Prince (1804–1806)

Salm-Reifferscheid-Raitz (complete list) –
Charles Joseph, Altgrave (1769–1790), Prince (1790–1811)

Salm-Salm (complete list) –
Konstantin Alexander, Prince (1778–1813)

Sayn-Wittgenstein-Berleburg (complete list) –
Albrecht, Prince (1800–1806)

Sayn-Wittgenstein-Hohenstein (complete list) –
Friedrich II, Count (1796–1801), Prince (1801–1806)

Prince-Bishopric of Sion (complete list) –
Joseph Anton Blatter, Prince-Bishop (1790–1807)

Solms-Braunfels (complete list) –
Wilhelm Christian Karl, Prince (1783–1806)

Prince-Bishopric of Strasbourg (complete list) –
Louis René Édouard de Rohan-Guéméné, Prince-Bishop (1779–1801)
Jean Pierre Saurine, Prince-Bishop (1802–1803)

Prince-Bishopric of Speyer (complete list) –
Philipp Franz Wilderich of Walderdorf, Prince-bishop (1801–1802)

Principality of Waldeck and Pyrmont (complete list) –
Friedrich Karl August, Prince (1763–1812)

Prince-Bishopric of Worms (complete list) –
Friedrich Karl Josef von Erthal, Prince-bishop (1774–1802)

Lower Saxon

Bremen-Verden (complete list) –
George III, Duke (1760–1807, 1813–1820)

Principality of Brunswick-Wolfenbüttel/ Principality of Wolfenbüttel (complete list) –
Charles William Ferdinand, Prince (1780–1806)
Frederick William, Prince of Brunswick-Wolfenbüttel (1806–1807), Duke of Brunswick (1813–1815)
conquered by the French Kingdom of Westphalia, 1807–1813; in 1814 reformed as the: Duchy of Brunswick

Duchy of Brunswick (complete list) –
Frederick William, Prince of Brunswick-Wolfenbüttel (1806–1807), Duke of Brunswick (1813–1815)

Gandersheim Abbey (complete list) –
Augusta Dorothea, Princess-Abbess (1778–1810)

Electorate/ Kingdom of Hanover (complete list) –
George III, Elector (1760–1806), King (1814–1820)

Free City of Hamburg (complete list) –
Franz Anton Wagener, Mayor (1790–1801)
Peter Hinrich Widow, Mayor (1800–1802)
Friedrich von Graffen, Mayor (1801–1810)
Wilhelm Amsinck, Mayor (1802)
Johann Arnold Heise, Mayor (1807)

Prince-Bishopric of Hildesheim (complete list) –
Franz Egon von Fürstenberg, Prince-bishop (1789–1803)

Duchy of Holstein 
Dukes (complete list) –	
Christian VII, Duke of Holstein-Glückstadt (1766–1773), of Holstein (1773–1808)
Statholders (complete list) –
Charles of Hesse-Kassel, Statholder (1768–1836)

Prince-bishopric of Lübeck (complete list) –
Peter Frederick Louis, Prince-bishop (1785–1803)

Free City of Lübeck (complete list) –
, Mayor (1804)
, Mayor (1805)
, Mayor (1806)
, Mayor (1806)

Duchy/ Grand Duchy of Mecklenburg-Schwerin (complete list) –
Frederick Francis I, Duke (1785–1815), Grand Duke (1815–1837)

Duchy/ Grand Duchy of Mecklenburg-Strelitz (complete list) –
Charles II, Duke (1794–1815), Grand Duke (1815–1816)

Duchy/ Grand Duchy of Oldenburg (complete list) –
Wilhelm, Duke (1784/85–1810, 1813–1815), Grand Duke (1815–1823)

Upper Saxon
Electorate/ Kingdom of Saxony (complete list) –
Frederick Augustus the Just, Elector (1763–1806), King (1806–1827)

Electorate of Brandenburg, Kingdom of Prussia (complete list, complete list) –
Frederick William III, Elector (1797–1806), King (1797–1840)

Anhalt-Bernburg (complete list) –
Alexius Frederick Christian, Prince (1796–1807), Duke (1807–1834)

Anhalt-Bernburg-Schaumburg-Hoym (complete list) –
Karl Louis, Prince (1772–1806)

Anhalt-Dessau (complete list) –
Leopold III, Prince (1751–1758), Duke (1758–1817), Regent of Anhalt-Köthen (1812–1817)

Reuss-Ebersdorf (complete list) –
Heinrich LI, Count (1779–1806), Prince (1806–1822)

Anhalt-Köthen (complete list) –
Augustus Christian Frederick, Prince (1789–1806), Duke (1806–1812)

Reuss-Greiz (complete list) –
Heinrich XIII, Prince (1800–1817)

Reuss-Lobenstein (complete list) –
Heinrich XXXV, Count (1782–1790), Prince (1790–1805)
Heinrich LIV, Prince (1805–1824)

Reuss-Schleiz (complete list) –
Heinrich XLII, Count (1784–1806), Prince (1806–1818)

Saxe-Coburg-Saalfeld (complete list) –
Francis, Duke (1800–1806)

Saxe-Gotha-Altenburg (complete list) –
Ernest II, Duke (1772–1804)
Augustus, Duke (1804–1822)

Saxe-Altenburg, Saxe-Hildburghausen (complete list) –
Frederick, Duke of Saxe-Hildburghausen (1780–1826), of Saxe-Altenburg (1826–1834)

Saxe-Meiningen (complete list) –
Georg I, Duke (1782–1803)
Louise Eleonore of Hohenlohe-Langenburg, Regent (1803–1821)

Saxe-Weimar-Eisenach (complete list) –
Karl August, Duke (1758–1815), Grand Duke (1815–1828)

Schwarzburg-Rudolstadt (complete list) –
Louis Frederick II, Prince (1793–1807)

Schwarzburg-Sondershausen (complete list) –
, Prince (1794–1835)

Stolberg-Rossla (de:complete list) –
Heinrich Friedrich Christian zu Stolberg-Roßla, Count (1768–1806)

Stolberg-Stolberg (de:complete list) –
Karl Ludwig zu Stolberg-Stolberg, Count (1765–1806)

Stolberg-Wernigerode (complete list) –
Christian Frederick, Count (1778–1807)

Swabian

Prince-Bishopric of Augsburg (complete list) –
Clemens Wenceslaus of Saxony, Prince-bishop (1768–1803)

Margraviate/ Electorate/ Grand Duchy of Baden (complete list, complete list) –
Charles Frederick, Margrave of Baden-Durlach (1746–1771), of Baden (1771–1803), Elector (1803–1806), Grand Duke (1806–1811)

Breisgau –
Prince-Bishopric of Constance (complete list) –
Karl Theodor von Dahlberg, Prince-bishop (1799–1803)

Prince-Provostry of Ellwangen (complete list) –
Clemens Wenceslaus, Prince-provost (1787–1803)

Gutenzell Abbey (de:complete list) –
Maria Justina von Erolzheim, Princess-abbess (1776–1803)

Hohenzollern-Hechingen (complete list) –
Hermann, Prince (1798–1810)

Hohenzollern-Sigmaringen (complete list) –
Anton Aloys, Prince (1785–1831)

Princely Abbey of Kempten (complete list) –
:de:Castolus Reichlin von Meldegg, Prince-abbot (1793–1803)

Königsegg-Aulendorf (complete list) –
Ernest, Count (1786–1803)
Francis, Count (1803–1806)

Königsegg-Rothenfels (complete list) –
Francis Fidelis Anthony, Count (1771–1804)

Oettingen-Wallerstein (complete list) –
Kraft Ernst, Count (1766–1774), Prince (1774–1802)
Ludwig Kraft, Prince (1802–1806)

Stadion-Thannhausen (complete list) –
John George Joseph Nepomuk, Count (1785–1806)

Stadion-Warthausen (complete list) –
Johann Philipp, Count (1787–1806)

Duchy/ Electorate/ *Kingdom of Württemberg (complete list) –
Frederick I, Duke (1797–1803), Elector (1803–1805), King (1805–1816)

References

Bibliography

19th century
 
-
19th century in the Holy Roman Empire